"Teenage Kicks" is the debut single by Northern Irish punk rock band the Undertones. Written in the summer of 1977 by the band's principal songwriter, the song was recorded on 15 June 1978 and initially released that September on independent Belfast record label Good Vibrations, before the band signed to Sire Records on 2 October 1978. Sire Records subsequently obtained all copyrights to the material released upon the Teenage Kicks EP and the song was re-released as a standard vinyl single on Sire's own label on 14 October that year, reaching number 31 in the UK Singles Chart two weeks after its release

The single was not included upon the original May 1979 release of the band's debut album The Undertones; however, the October 1979 re-release of this debut album included both "Teenage Kicks" and the Undertones' second single, "Get Over You".

Influential BBC Radio 1 DJ John Peel is known to have repeatedly stated "Teenage Kicks" to be his all-time favourite song from 1978 until his death in 2004. When he first played the song on his show on 25 September, he played the song twice (something he had never previously done). Peel also specifically requested sections of the lyrics of the song be engraved upon his tombstone. The song has also been ranked as the second best indie song of all time in a 2016 poll conducted by an alternative music radio station (after "Freak Scene" by Dinosaur Jr.).

In 2008, the song served as the theme song to the ITV sitcom of the same name.

Impact

John Peel
Upon first hearing "Teenage Kicks" in September 1978, BBC Radio 1 DJ John Peel is reported to have burst into tears, and readily admitted to still being moved to tears upon hearing the song in interviews granted to journalists up until his death. To judge songs he had heard for the first time as to worthiness of airplay upon his show, Peel often rated new bands' songs with a series of asterisks, with each song judged upon a scale of one to five asterisks: Peel was so taken by "Teenage Kicks", he awarded the song 28 stars. On one occasion, he is known to have played the song twice in a row, with the explanation given to his audience being, "It doesn't get much better than this."

In a 2001 interview given to The Guardian, Peel stated that apart from his name, the only words he wished to be engraved upon his gravestone were the opening lyrics to "Teenage Kicks": "Teenage dreams so hard to beat?"

In February 2008, a headstone engraved with these words was placed on his grave in the Suffolk village of Great Finborough.

In 2004, a mural in tribute to Peel, featuring the opening line of "Teenage Kicks", appeared on a Belfast flyover.

Documentaries
 Teenage Kicks - The Undertones is a 2001 documentary film directed by Tom Collins.
 Here Comes the Summer: The Undertones Story is a 2012 BBC-commissioned documentary focusing upon the Undertones. The documentary was broadcast on BBC Four in September that year. This documentary also features interviews with current and former members of the Undertones (excluding Feargal Sharkey) in addition to fans, friends and additional personnel involved in the band's recordings and career.

Track listing

Charts

Certifications

Covers
 "Teenage Kicks" was acoustically covered by Snow Patrol in a tribute to John Peel, and was played at his funeral.
 Busted covered "Teenage Kicks" on their second album A Present for Everyone released on 17 November 2003.
 All-male pop group One Direction covered "Teenage Kicks" (in a medley with Blondie's single "One Way or Another") for the 2013 Comic Relief single "One Way or Another (Teenage Kicks)".

Notes

References

External links
 2016 Guardian news article describing Michael Bradley's recollections of the writing and recording of the "Teenage Kicks" EP
 Contemporary article detailing the recording process of the "Teenage Kicks" EP
 The Undertones' official website

Songs about teenagers
1978 debut singles
1978 songs
Sire Records singles
Songs written by John O'Neill (guitarist)
The Undertones songs